African Planning Association was a professional town planning institute formed in 2006 following resolutions of the first Planning Africa Conference in September 2002 held in Durban, South Africa. Its formation combined representatives from UN-HABITAT, Commonwealth Association of Planners, and South African Planning Institute. It sought to address gaps in the practice of planning in Africa as a rapidly urbanizing region. In 2019,  following the publication of the State of Planning in Africa report, the African Urban Community of Practice (AUCOP) and the African Planning Association gave way to the African Planning Society.

See also 

 African Planning Society

References 

Defunct organisations based in South Africa
Professional planning institutes